Parthian Partners Limited (PPL) is a Nigerian capital market conglomerate based in  Lagos, Nigeria. The company was incorporated as a Private Limited Liability in Nigeria in 2012. PPL is licensed and regulated by the Securities and Exchange Commission (SEC) and an FMDQ Exchange associate member. The company was awarded the Best Brokerage Service Award by the FMDQ Gold Awards in 2018.  Parthian Partners is rated as a company with a stable financial outlook.

History 
Parthian Partners Limited (PPL) was incorporated as a Private Limited Liability in Nigeria in 2012. Subsequently, In 2013, PPL obtained a license to operate as an Inter-Dealer Broker, making the company the first of the six FMDQ Securities Exchange Limited (FMDQ Exchange) registered Inter-Dealer Brokers in Nigeria.

PPL provides wholesale brokerage services for transactions among Market Dealers and between Market Dealers and Investors including Pension Fund Administrators, Fund Managers, Banks, and International Financial Institutions. PPL also facilitates trading in Federal Government of Nigeria (FGN) Bonds and Treasury Bills, State Government Bonds, Local Contractor Bonds, Corporate Bonds , and Eurobonds. In 2018, Parthian Partners launched the first digital platform to access treasury bills in Nigeria in partnership with Sterling Bank. In 2016, PPL acquired a Broker/Dealer License for its subsidiary, PSL Capital Limited to provide securities trading services to Retail Investors as well as the Wholesale Market. In 2021, PSL changed its name to Parthian Securities Limited.

Parthian Securities Limited 
Formerly PSL Capital, Parthian Securities Limited is an independent subsidiary of Parthian Partners Limited. The company operates under full licensing by the Securities and Exchange Commission(SEC) in Nigeria and is a member of the Nigerian Stock Exchange (NSE). PSL Capital Limited provides securities trading services to Retail Investors as well as the Wholesale Market.

I-invest 
The platform was developed by Parthian Partners and launched in 2018 as a mobile application to give individuals direct access to buy treasury bills in Nigeria; the first mobile solution for Treasury bills in Nigeria. Six (6) months into its launch, i-invest generated Two (2) Billion Naira worth of investments on the platform.By 2021, the application became an integrated platform for finance management with added features for savings, and payment collection.

Corporate leadership 
 Board Chaiman - Adedotun Sulaiman (MFR)
Managing Director & CEO - Oluseye Olusoga
 Non Executive Directors - Engr. Kadiri Adebayo Adeola, Rilwan Belo-Osagie, Bismarck J. Rewane, Dr. Abraham Nwankwo

Awards

See also 
 Nigerian stockbrokers
 List of investment firms in Nigeria
 Economy of Nigeria
 Inter-dealer brokers

References 

Companies based in Lagos
Conglomerate companies of Nigeria
Nigerian companies established in 2012
Companies listed on the Nigerian Stock Exchange